The 1996 K League Championship was the fourth competition of the K League Championship, and was held to decide the 14th champions of the K League. It was contested between winners of two stages of the regular season, and was played over two legs.

Qualified teams

First leg

Second leg
The second leg of the 1996 K League Championship is regarded as one of the most violent matches in history of the K League. During the match, the referee took out the yellow card 14 times, and a total of five players were sent off.

Final table

See also
1996 K League

References

External links
RSSSF
 
 

K League Championship
K